The 1994 season in Swedish football, starting January 1994 and ending December 1994:

Honours

Official titles

Competitions

Promotions, relegations and qualifications

Promotions

League transfers

Relegations

International qualifications

Domestic results

Allsvenskan 1994

Allsvenskan qualification play-off 1994

Division 1 Norra 1994

Division 1 Södra 1994

Division 1 qualification play-off 1994 
1st round

2nd round

Svenska Cupen 1993–94 
Final

National team results

Notes

References 
Print

Online

External links

 
Seasons in Swedish football